Bits is the fourth and final album by Oxford Collapse. Two singles were released from the album, "The Birthday Wars" and "Young Love Delivers".

Track listing
All tracks by Oxford Collapse

 "Electric Arc" – 2:42
 "The Birthday Wars" – 2:14
 "Vernon-Jackson" – 2:42
 "Young Love Delivers" – 3:49
 "Back of the Yards" – 2:26
 "A Wedding" – 2:45
 "Featherbeds" – 3:17
 "For the Winter Coats" – 3:15
 "Men and Their Ideas" – 1:50
 "Children's Crusade" – 3:03
 "John Blood" – 3:59
 "B-Roll" – 2:38
 "I Hate Nobody" – 3:47

Personnel 
Michael Pace – vocals, guitars, 
Dan Fetherston – drums 
Adam Rizer – bass, vocals.

References

2008 albums
Oxford Collapse albums
Sub Pop albums